Christ Church, in Rochester, New York, is a parish in the Episcopal Diocese of Rochester. It is located at 141 East Avenue.

The church was listed on the National Register of Historic Places in 2008.

The church is a large Gothic Revival style building made of "rock-faced red Albion sandstone".  It sports buttresses and flying buttresses.

References

External links

Churches on the National Register of Historic Places in New York (state)
Churches completed in 1894
19th-century Episcopal church buildings
Churches in Rochester, New York
Episcopal church buildings in New York (state)
National Register of Historic Places in Rochester, New York